The IV ALBA Games (Spanish: Juegos del ALBA Bicentenario) is a multi-sport event held between 17–30 July 2011 in ten different states of Venezuela. The games are organized by the Bolivarian Alliance for the Americas (ALBA).

Participating nations
The following countries are expected to compete. The number of competitors qualified by each delegation is indicated in parentheses.

 (157) 

 (368) 

 (126) 

 (134) 

 (806)

Sports

Cycling

Gymnastics

Medal table

References

External links
Official website 

Alba
Alba
Alba
A
International sports competitions hosted by Venezuela
Multi-sport events in Venezuela
ALBA Games
Alba
ALBA Ganes